Boler Mountain, previously known as the London Ski Club, is a not for profit recreation club in London, Ontario. The mountain is located in the western suburban neighbourhood of Byron and is used for skiing, snowboarding and snow tubing in the winter and for mountain biking, hiking, zip lining, and beach volleyball in the summer. Despite its title, it is more accurately described as a hill than a mountain. The facility is relatively small but very conveniently located for Londoners. After the 2012 completion of the West Hill expansion, Boler has 3 quad chairlifts, a magic carpet and a tube carpet serving 16 trails.

History 
The hill has been in operation since 1946 and is Canada's most southerly ski hill.  It began as a single run on the southeasternmost section of the modern hill, accessed by a gravel road from Boler Road, just south of today's Gatineau Road. The small ski club property expanded westward over the years, and the current chalet was built in 2017. The original Boler Road access was closed off around the same time to permit the building of a subdivision, and the entrance moved to the newly extended Griffith Street where it met the original road.

Boler Mountain was served by three T-bar lifts throughout the 1970s and 80s, the westernmost of which was replaced by a quad-chairlift in the early 1990s. The other two T-bar lifts were replaced by a single quad-chairlift in 2003. A fourth T-bar lift had been partially constructed in the early 1980s on a then-newly acquired area of land immediately west of the chalet that came to be known as Hill 2000. The lift never was completed, and was mostly dismantled in 1997. A tubing hill was added at the base of Hill 2000 in January 1998. Work on Hill 2000, later renamed West Hill, progressed slowly from 1978 to final completion in February 2012. Boler officials attribute the delay to the need to wait for donated loads of dirt from construction elsewhere in the city.

The summer venue was home to the 2001 Canada Summer Games mountain biking event.

Boler Mountain added the Treetop Adventure Park complete with zip lines and aerial challenges in 2013.

It also hosted the Great Northern Concrete Toboggan Race in early 2014.

Runs 
There are 16 runs at Boler Mountain.

Programs 
In the winter months Boler Mountain hosts a variety of programs. The snow school at Boler Mountain offers both ski and snowboarding lessons that depend on the skill and age of the student. Boler also has a Track 3 program which currently has 250 volunteer instructors serving over 120 disabled skiers each season. Boler is also the home of London Ski Club Racing, which offers programs for all ages. In the summer season Boler Mountain hosts a mountain bike camp for children between the ages of 7 and 13. Also, there are weekly bike racing events.

See also
 Beaver Valley Ski Club
 Chicopee Ski Club
 Glen Eden
 Whistler Blackcomb
 Mammoth Mountain
 List of ski areas and resorts in Canada

External links
Official Site

Sport in London, Ontario
Ski areas and resorts in Ontario
Geography of London, Ontario
Companies based in London, Ontario
Tourist attractions in London, Ontario